Hormathus is a genus of beetles in the family Cerambycidae, containing the following species:

 Hormathus bicolor Zayas, 1975
 Hormathus cinctellus Gahan, 1890
 Hormathus giesberti Lingafelter & Nearns, 2007

References

Ibidionini